Jamiel "Jimmy" Alexander Chagra (December 7, 1944 – July 25, 2008) was an American drug trafficker, carpet salesman and professional gambler. He was implicated in the May 1979 assassination of United States District Judge John H. Wood Jr. in San Antonio, Texas.

Chagra was active as a trafficker of marijuana beginning in the 1960s, and by the 1970s was a well-known drug trafficker operating out of Las Vegas and El Paso. In fact, he is described as having been "no less than the biggest marijuana smuggler in the country" during that time. According to George Knapp writing for Las Vegas CityLife, he was "the undisputed marijuana kingpin of the Western world. He imported more high-grade ganja than anyone, tons at a time, planeload after planeload."

Early life
Jamiel Chagra, known as Jimmy, was born in El Paso, Texas on December 7, 1944. Jimmy was born the middle son of a Lebanese rug merchant family. His mother was named Josephine, and his father Abdou Chagra. He had two brothers, Lee and Joseph, who were both attorneys involved with the legal defense of drug smugglers. Jimmy Chagra also had a sister named Patsy. Their family name was historically "Busha’ada", but Jimmy's grandfather changed it. His grandfather was imprisoned before Jimmy was born, and the family immigrated to El Paso from Mexico.

Jimmy got into drug smuggling in 1969 and became one of the largest smugglers in the United States, trafficking drugs from Mexico and Colombia by plane and boat. He had dealings with the Patriarca crime family and Joseph Bonanno, the retired head of the Bonanno crime family. Chagra was also a heavy gambler in Las Vegas, Nevada, and attracted attention with his flamboyant ways. Reportedly, he used gambling as a method of laundering money he received through trafficking drugs.

Prior to his arrest, he accumulated approximately $100 million in various bank accounts, today amounting to about $500 million. He had a $1 million mansion in Las Vegas.

Chagra's drug dealings came under close scrutiny by law enforcement and the judicial system. On November 21, 1978, Assistant U.S. Attorney James Kerr was ambushed and shot at near his home by two men who fired 19 bullets at his car. Kerr escaped with only minor glass cuts. Kerr had been involved with pursuing Chagra for his drug dealings.

On December 23, 1978, Lee Chagra was shot and killed in his law office in El Paso. Lee had been involved with Jimmy in his drug smuggling and the killers took $450,000 that was owed to Joe Bonanno for a drug deal. A few months later, Luis "Lou" Fred Esper, a small-time drug dealer and acquaintance of Lee Chagra, and two U.S. Army soldiers from Fort Bliss were held on various charges related to the murder of Lee. The soldiers implicated Esper in planning the heist, but he received a considerably lighter sentence than they due to not being technically involved with the murder itself.

Murder of John H. Wood
Chagra's downfall began in February 1979 when he was arrested on trafficking charges. He was scheduled to appear before United States District Judge John Wood, a judge nicknamed "Maximum John" who had a reputation for giving out the maximum sentence allowed for drug-related crimes. Chagra faced a possible life sentence without parole if convicted and reportedly feared he would receive a life sentence, according to prosecutors. Chagra attempted to bribe Judge Wood for "$5 million or 10 million". Facing life for smuggling, Jimmy Chagra allegedly decided to have the judge killed.

Chagra was accused of (and was acquitted of, although he later confessed to conspiracy in a deal to help his wife) hiring hitman Charles Harrelson (actor Woody Harrelson's father) to kill Wood for $250,000; on May 29, 1979, Judge Wood was murdered outside his home by a shot in the back. He was the first federal judge to die by assassination in over a century. The authorities did not immediately suspect Chagra of involvement in the assassination, and it took thousands of man-hours to identify them as suspects in the case. His drug case went to trial and Chagra was found guilty in August 1979 and sentenced to 30 years. Chagra jumped bail, but was captured six months later in Las Vegas.

Harrelson was eventually caught and convicted of being the gunman after Chagra discussed the assassination with his brother Joe during Joe's visit to Jimmy in United States Penitentiary in Leavenworth, Kansas, after FBI agents bugged the rooms in which they were speaking.  This was among over a thousand recorded conversations that the government had collected as evidence. The position of federal authorities was that even though Joe Chagra was a lawyer, he was also suspected in conspiracy to conceal the crime; therefore, their conversations were not covered by attorney-client privilege.

Both Harrelson and Chagra's brother Joe were implicated in the assassination. Joe Chagra testified against the other defendants in exchange for pleading guilty to murder-conspiracy with a maximum sentence of ten years in a plea-bargain deal, and with an agreement that he would not testify against his brother Jimmy in a separate trial. Joe Chagra's defense reportedly attempted to plead guilty to a lesser offense of conspiring to obstruct justice instead. Charles Harrelson got two consecutive life terms plus 5 years, Harrelson's wife Jo Ann got 25 years and Jimmy Chagra's wife Elizabeth was also sent to prison for 30 years for delivering the payout money. Jimmy Chagra was acquitted of the murder of Judge Wood in front of Judge William S. Sessions, future director of the FBI, although he was found guilty of obstructing justice and conspiring to smuggle drugs. Chagra's lawyer in the case was Oscar Goodman, future Mayor of Las Vegas and prosecutors included Assistant United States Attorney Sidney Powell.

In a deal with the federal government, Jimmy Chagra admitted to his role in the murder of Judge Wood and the attempted murder of Assistant United States Attorney James Kerr. He reportedly did this in order to have his wife, Elizabeth, released early. His wife was never released and she died in custody of ovarian cancer at age 41. Joe Chagra served six and a half years in prison (of his ten-year sentence) and was released. He died from injuries resulting from an automobile accident that occurred on December 6, 1996.

At the time, the case of Judge Wood's murder was described as "the most extensive [investigation by the FBI] since President Kennedy's murder in 1963." It was otherwise described as "one of the most intense investigations in the annals of the FBI". Jurors heard hours worth of tape recordings and more than 500 pages of documents were presented. The FBI conducted more than 30,000 interviews related to the case and in total collected more than 500,000 pieces of information. The investigation cost more than $11 million.

Later life and death
Chagra was released from prison for health reasons in Atlanta, Georgia, on December 9, 2003. He was widely believed to have been placed in the Federal Witness Protection Program. However, his sister Patsy stated that he was not in the witness protection program at the time of his death. The story surrounding the assassination of Judge Wood was profiled in an episode of City Confidential. A fictitious name reference to the Judge John Wood assassination also appeared in an The FBI Files episode "Dangerous Company" as the show regularly changed names of real-life people to protect privacy. He was also used in FBI: The Untold Stories.

Chagra married his third wife, Lynda Ray, while living under the name James Madrid on November 22, 2005. They were married in Las Vegas.

He had seven children, including a daughter named Catherine, who wrote a memoir about the family.

Jimmy Chagra died of cancer on July 25, 2008. He was living in a trailer camp in Mesa, Arizona.

References

Further reading
Gary Cartwright, Dirty Dealing: Drug Smuggling on the Mexican Border and the Assassination of a Federal Judge, 1998
Sally Denton and Roger Morris, The Money and the Power: The Making of Las Vegas and Its Hold on America, 2002
John L. Smith, Of Rats and Men: Oscar Goodman's Life from Mob Mouthpiece to Mayor of Las Vegas, 2003

1944 births
2008 deaths
Criminals from Texas
People from El Paso, Texas
American drug traffickers
Deaths from cancer in Arizona
American people of Arab descent
American gangsters